The Fayetteville State Broncos and Lady Broncos are the athletic teams that represent Fayetteville State University, located in Fayetteville, North Carolina, in intercollegiate sports at the Division II level of the National Collegiate Athletic Association (NCAA), primarily competing in the Central Intercollegiate Athletic Association since the 1954–55 academic year.

Fayetteville State competes in eleven intercollegiate varsity sports. Men's sports include basketball, cross country, football, and golf; while women's sports include basketball, bowling, cross country, softball, track and field (indoor and outdoor), and volleyball. Women's tennis was discontinued at the end of the 2019–20 school year.

Conference affiliations 
NCAA
 Central Intercollegiate Athletic Association (1954–present)

Varsity teams 
The Broncos also sponsor a cheerleading team. The program sponsored a women's tennis team until the end of the 2019–20 season.

Football 
The university won back-to-back CIAA football championships in 2002 and 2003. They also won the 2009 CIAA Football Championship and advanced to the NCAA Division II football playoff.  The Broncos were Western Division Champions in 2002, 2003, 2004, 2009, 2017, 2018 and 2019.

Notable alumni

Football 
 Garry Battle
 Andre Bowden
 Chris Hubert
 Sylvester Ritter, former WWE wrestler and Hall of Fame inductee. Wrestled under the ring name Junkyard Dog
 Kion Smith
 Joshua Williams

Men's basketball 
 Jeff Capel II
 Jalen Seegars, American basketball player

References

External links